Seychelles requires its residents to register their motor vehicles and display vehicle registration plates.

References

Seychelles
Transport in Seychelles
Seychelles transport-related lists